Sulfamethizole is a sulfonamide antibiotic.

References

 
 
 

Sulfonamide antibiotics
Thiadiazoles